Kumho Engineering and Construction is a Korean civil engineering and construction company based in South Korea.

It is a corporate member of the Kumho Asiana Group.

External links 
 

Construction and civil engineering companies of South Korea
Kumho Asiana Group
Construction and civil engineering companies established in 1967
South Korean companies established in 1967